Central Dauphin East High School is a large, suburban, public high school located in Harrisburg, Dauphin County, Pennsylvania. It is one of two high schools operated by the Central Dauphin School District. In the 2017–2018 school year, enrollment was reported as 1,472 pupils in 9th through 12th grades.

History
Central Dauphin East High School opened in 1961. Central Dauphin School District was created in 1954, and this merger of several school districts was completed by the opening of Central Dauphin High School.

In the late 1990s, overcrowding in the Central Dauphin School District resulted in a proposal to merge Central Dauphin East High School with nearby rival Central Dauphin High School. The proposal was opposed by Central Dauphin East High School and was later voted down by the school board (after its removal in the election the week before). In 2000, the school board voted to build a third high school, but in a sudden turnaround by the school board, it was decided that the district would have only two high schools.

Since 1961, the yearbook has been called the Oriens. The school newspaper is called the Panther Print.

Federal School Improvement grant
In 2010, the Central Dauphin School District applied for and was awarded a $2,099,888 grant, by the state and federal government. The money had to be used to transform the high school. The Transformation process specifies that the administration use of rigorous, transparent, and equitable evaluation systems for teachers and principals, high-quality professional development and design and development of curriculum with teacher and principal involvement. The school qualified for the grant due to the chronic low student achievement.

Music program
Central Dauphin East's music program consists of four bands, five choirs, and two orchestras. Bands include the wind ensemble, concert, jazz, and marching band. The choirs include EHS Choraliers, Women's Ensemble, Concert Choir, and Varsity Choir. Each part of the music department holds several concerts throughout the school year, including the annual spring musical, and seasonal concerts held in the auditorium.  The arts are supported through the fall play.

Extracurriculars
Central Dauphin East High School offers a variety of extracurricular programs including: clubs, activities and sports.

Clubs
Central Dauphin East offers a number of clubs. Students can create new clubs with the principal's approval.

ACLU Club
Bowling
CASEF
Cultural Diversity
Fall play
FBLA (Future Business Leaders of America)
Indoor Guard/Majorettes/Drumline
Key Club
Environmental Club
Latin Club
Marching Band
National Honor Society
Yearbook Club
School Store
The Roaring Panther (Newspaper)
SADD (Students Against Destructive Decisions)
Science Olympiad
Ski Club
ESL Club
Step Team
Student Council
Environment Club
Model UN
Ski Club
Renaissance Team
Rugby Team
TV Studio Club
Genshiken (The Manga and Anime Club)
Future Medical Leaders of America (FMLA)

Sports
The district funds:

Boys
Baseball - AAA
Basketball- AAAAAA
Cross Country - AAA
Football - AAAAAA
Golf - AAA
Lacrosse - AAAA
Soccer - AAA
Swimming and Diving - AAA
Tennis - AAA
Track and Field - AAA
Volleyball - AAA
Wrestling - AAA

Girls
Basketball - AAAAAA
Cheerleading - AAAA
Cross Country - AAA
Field Hockey - AAA
Golf - AAA
Lacrosse - AAAA
Soccer (Fall) - AAA
Softball - AAA
Swimming and Diving - AAA
Girls' Tennis - AAA
Track and Field - AAA
Volleyball - AAA

According to PIAA directory October 2016

Notable alumni
 Chase Edmonds (Class of 2014) - 2014 Jerry Rice Award Winner, 2018 NFL 4th Round Draft Pick by the Arizona Cardinals
 Hyleas Fountain - Olympic Silver Medalist Heptathlon 2008 Beijing
 Jeffrey Gaines (Class of 1984) - American singer-songwriter and guitarist
 Candace Gingrich (Class of 1984) - LGBT rights activist
 Mark S. McNaughton (Class of 1981) - former Pennsylvania state representative
 Dustin Pague (Class of 2006) - current Mixed Martial Artist, formerly fighting in the UFC as a bantamweight
 Michael Payton (Class of 1988) - college football hall of famer
 Stephen C. Sillett - a botanist and pioneer in the study of tall trees
 Ciara Renée (Class of 2009) - Broadway actor in Big Fish and Pippin. Starred as Kendra Saunders/Hawkgirl in Legends of Tomorrow on The CW
 Cody Webster (Class of 2010) - 2013 Big Ten Conference, Eddleman–Fields Punter of the Year

Notes and references

External links
 Central Dauphin School District

Educational institutions established in 1961
Education in Harrisburg, Pennsylvania
High schools in Central Pennsylvania
Susquehanna Valley
Schools in Dauphin County, Pennsylvania
Public high schools in Pennsylvania
1961 establishments in Pennsylvania